The Sierra Peaks Section (SPS) is a mountaineering society within the Angeles Chapter of the Sierra Club that serves to provide mountaineering activities for Sierra Club members in the Sierra Nevada, and to honor mountaineers who have summited Sierra Nevada peaks.

History
The Sierra Peaks Section was established in 1955. The Section maintains historic summit registers at Bancroft Library on the University of California, Berkeley campus.

Membership
To become a member of the SPS, one must be a Sierra Club member and have climbed at least six peaks on the SPS List; it is not necessary that the peaks be Emblem peaks. For verification purposes, two of those ascents must be done on an official SPS trip.

Especially accomplished members are award with emblems, with the following grades (from highest to lowest):
 Third List Completion
 Second List Completion
 First List Completion
 Master Emblem
 Senior Emblem
 Emblem

Upon receiving one of the normal emblems, members may be recognized with one of the following additional emblems, which are not ranked:
 Geographic Emblem
 Explorer Emblem

SPS List

To the general public, they are most known for their peak bagging list, created in 1955, a product of the Sierra Club's long legacy of promoting climbing in the Sierra Nevada. Completing the list is highly prestigious in American mountaineering circles, and climbers who complete the list are often cited as having done so (e.g. by the American Alpine Club).

The list is divided into three levels of importance. The Emblem peaks are considered the most iconic peaks of the Sierra Nevada, and to summit all of them is the goal of many peak baggers and alpinists. Mountaineers peaks are less notable peaks known for presenting mountaineering challenges; they do not have the prestige that Emblem peaks have attached to them, but ascending them is necessary to gain higher levels of recognition for Section members. Finally, there are the numerous general peaks of lesser note.

Some peaks require substantial rock climbing experience (e.g. North Palisade and Mount Clarence King), and in some cases snow travel skills. Most peaks may require few technical skills, although the commonly cited difficulty ratings of peak climbs in the Sierra Nevada are considered to be understated, or “sandbagged”. The majority of peaks are very remote and require substantial cross-country travel.

The list is an example of a subjective "decision by committee" list with the peaks on the list being determined by the Sierra Club. Peaks are occasionally added or removed from the list due to a variety of factors, such as accessibility, notability, and interest. The list is followed by thousands of hikers and climbers and has been noted in numerous books and guides on the Sierra Nevada.

There are 15 Emblem peaks, 35 Mountaineers peaks, and 197 general peaks, for a total of 247 peaks. The number of peaks is traditionally set at 248, the original number of peaks listed in 1955; however the number changes at times due to issues such as legal access or higher interest in one peak over another.

The elevations listed below are those officially described on the list (based on USGS topographic map contours), and may not be the actual elevations of those peaks, although they are usually accurate to within 50 feet.

Emblem Peaks

Mountaineers Peaks

Full list

Area 1: Southern Sierra
Pilot Knob (suspended)
Owens Peak
Spanish Needle
Lamont Peak
Sawtooth Peak
Rockhouse Peak
Taylor Dome
Sirretta Peak
Crag Peak
Smith Mountain

Area 2: Mineral King and Kern River
Kern Peak
Angora Mountain
Coyote Peaks
North Maggie Mountain
Moses Mountain
Homers Nose
Vandever Mountain
Florence Peak
Sawtooth Peak
Needham Mountain

Area 3: Olancha to Langley and west
Olancha Peak
Cartago Peak
Muah Mountain
Cirque Peak
Mount Langley
Mount Guyot
Joe Devel Peak
Mount Pickering
Mount Chamberlin
Mount Newcomb
Mount Hitchcock

Area 4: Corcoran to Whitney
Mount Corcoran
Mount LeConte
Mount Mallory
Mount Irvine
Mount McAdie
Mount Muir
Mount Whitney
Thor Peak
Lone Pine Peak

Area 5: Whitney to Williamson
Mount Young
Mount Hale
Mount Russell
Mount Carillon
Tunnabora Peak
Mount Barnard
Trojan Peak
Mount Tyndall
Mount Williamson

Area 6: Kaweahs and west
Alta Peak
Mount Silliman
Mount Eisen
Lippincott Mountain
Eagle Scout Peak
Mount Stewart
Lion Rock
Mount Kaweah
Red Kaweah
Black Kaweah
Picket Guard Peak
Kern Point

Area 7: Great Western Divide
Triple Divide Peak
Glacier Ridge
Whaleback
Milestone Mountain
Midway Mountain
Table Mountain
Thunder Mountain
South Guard
Mount Brewer
North Guard

Area 8: Kings–Kern divide
Mount Jordan
Mount Genevra
Mount Ericsson
Mount Stanford
Deerhorn Mountain
East Vidette
West Vidette
Junction Peak
Mount Keith
Mount Bradley
Center Peak
Caltech Peak

Area 9: Kearsarge Pass vicinity
University Peak
Independence Peak
Kearsarge Peak
Mount Gould
Mount Rixford
Mount Bago
Mount Gardiner
Mount Cotter
Mount Clarence King
Dragon Peak
Black Mountain
Diamond Peak

Area 10: Baxter Pass to Taboose Pass
Mount Baxter
Colosseum Mountain
Mount Perkins
Mount Wynne
Mount Pinchot
Pyramid Peak
Arrow Peak
Striped Mountain
Goodale Mountain
Cardinal Mountain

Area 11: Western mid-Sierra
Mount Ruskin
Marion Peak
State Peak
Goat Mountain
Kennedy Mountain
Mount Harrington
Tehipite Dome
Spanish Mountain
Three Sisters

Area 12: South Palisades
Split Mountain
Mount Tinemaha
Mount Prater
Mount Bolton Brown
Birch Mountain
The Thumb
Disappointment Peak
Middle Palisade
Norman Clyde Peak
Palisade Crest

Area 13: Mt. Goddard vicinity
Observation Peak
Giraud Peak
Devil's Crag #1
Wheel Mountain
Mount McDuffie
Black Giant
Charybdis
Scylla
Mount Goddard
Mount Reinstein
Finger Peak
Tunemah Peak

Area 14: North Palisades
Temple Crag
Mount Gayley
Mount Sill
North Palisade
Thunderbolt Peak
Mount Winchell
Mount Agassiz
Mount Goode
Cloudripper
Mount Johnson
Mount Gilbert

Area 15: Evolution area
Mount Thompson
Point Powell
Mount Wallace
Mount Haeckel
Mount Fiske
Mount Huxley
Mount Darwin
Mount Mendel
Mount Lamarck
The Hermit
Mount McGee
Emerald Peak
Mount Henry

Area 16: Humphreys Basin and west
Mount Goethe
Mount Emerson
Mount Humphreys
Basin Mountain
Four Gables
Mount Tom
Pilot Knob
Gemini
Seven Gables
Mount Senger
Mount Hooper

Area 17: Bear Creek Spire area
Merriam Peak
Royce Peak
Mount Julius Caesar
Mount Hilgard
Recess Peak
Mount Gabb
Bear Creek Spire
Mount Dade
Mount Abbot
Mount Mills
Mount Morgan

Area 18: Mono Creek to Mammoth
Silver Peak
Mount Izaak Walton
Red and White Mountain
Red Slate Mountain
Mount Stanford
Mount Morgan
Mount Baldwin
Mount Morrison
Bloody Mountain

Area 19: Ritter Range and vicinity
Iron Mountain
Clyde Minaret
Mount Ritter
Banner Peak
Mount Davis
Rodgers Peak
Electra Peak
Foerster Peak
San Joaquin Mountain

Area 20: Clark Range and vicinity
Merced Peak
Red Peak
Gray Peak
Mount Clark
Mount Starr King
Half Dome
Clouds Rest

Area 21: Mt. Lyell and north
Cathedral Peak
Vogelsang Peak
Mount Florence
Mount Maclure
Mount Lyell
Koip Peak
Mount Gibbs
Mount Dana

Area 22: Tioga Pass to Bond Pass
Mount Warren
Mount Conness
North Peak
Excelsior Mountain
Dunderberg Peak
Virginia Peak
Twin Peaks
Whorl Mountain
Matterhorn Peak
Pettit Peak
Volunteer Peak
Piute Mountain
Tower Peak

Area 23: Bond Pass to Lake Tahoe
Black Hawk Mountain
Leavitt Peak
Stanislaus Peak
Disaster Peak
Highland Peak
Mokelumne Peak
Round Top
Freel Peak
Pyramid Peak
Dicks Peak
Mount Tallac

Area 24: Northern Sierra
Granite Chief
Tinker Knob
Castle Peak
Mount Rose
Mount Lola
English Mountain
Sierra Buttes
Mount Elwell
Adams Peak

See also
Other peak bagging lists:
New England Fifty Finest
Adirondack High Peaks

References

Bibliography

External links
Official web site

Peak bagging in the United States
Sierra Club